Lok Sin Tong Leung Chik Wai Memorial School (Chinese: 樂善堂梁植偉紀念中學) is a secondary school on Tsing Yi Island in Hong Kong. Situated within the fifth phase of Cheung Hong Estate near Liu To, the school was founded on 8 April 1986 by Lok Sin Tong, a charity based in Kowloon. It was the fourth secondary school on the island.

External links
Official website

Educational institutions established in 1986
Secondary schools in Hong Kong
Lok Sin Tong
Tsing Yi
1986 establishments in Hong Kong